The Gialo High is a relatively small horst block in the eastern Sirte Basin of the Libyan oil fields. It is most important and best known for the stacked oil fields in rocks ranging from Early Cretaceous to Oligocene age. There are several billion barrels of oil reserves associated with the structure both over the crest of the horst as well as flanking the high in the adjacent graben.

Present day explorers
There are three oil companies currently exploring for and producing oil from the Gialo High and the surrounding flanks. Wintershall operates Concession 97, Waha Oil Company operates Concession 59 and the Arabian Gulf Oil Company (Agoco) operates NC59. Some of the oil fields on the Gialo High and its flanks are Gialo, 6J-59, 4E-59 and Lidam.

Geography of Libya
Oil fields of Libya
Horsts (geology)